Gifty Mensah (born 7 October 1998) is a Ghanaian badminton player who joined the national team in 2010. In 2011, she plays for Accra, compete at the Ghana  Independence Day Open Championship. She won a gold in the women's doubles and a silver in the singles. At the same year, she was selected to represent her country to compete at the All-Africa Games. Teamed-up with Daniel Sam, they were the finalist at the 2015 Nigeria International tournament. In 2016, she was the runner-up at the Rose Hill International tournament in the mixed doubles event with Emmanuel Donkor, after battling with the Mauritanian Edoo and Louison. She also took the third place in the women's doubles event with Stella Amassah. In 2018, she competed at the Commonwealth Games in Gold Coast.

Achievements

BWF International Challenge/Series
Mixed Doubles

 BWF International Challenge tournament
 BWF International Series tournament
 BWF Future Series tournament

References

External links
 

1998 births
Living people
People from Accra
Ghanaian female badminton players
Badminton players at the 2018 Commonwealth Games
Commonwealth Games competitors for Ghana
Competitors at the 2011 All-Africa Games
Competitors at the 2015 African Games
African Games competitors for Ghana